Big Talk Productions Limited is a British film and television production company founded by Nira Park in 1994. Big Talk was acquired by ITV Studios in 2013.

Film

Filmography

Released

Upcoming

Critical reception

Commercial performance

TV shows

List of TV shows

Awards and nominations

References

External links 
 
 Big Talk Productions at the Internet Movie Database
 Big Talk Productions on Twitter

Film production companies of the United Kingdom
Television production companies of the United Kingdom
Mass media companies established in 1994
British companies established in 1994
ITV (TV network)
2013 mergers and acquisitions